Gergely Balázs (born 21 December 1982 in Debrecen) is a Hungarian football (forward) player who currently plays for Hajdúböszörményi TE.

External links
Player profile at HLSZ

References

Bibliography 
 Gábor T. Szabó (editor) Futballévkönyv 2005. Aréna 2000 (publisher), 2005. ISSN 1585-2172

1982 births
Living people
Sportspeople from Debrecen
Hungarian footballers
Association football forwards
Debreceni VSC players
Diósgyőri VTK players
Nyíregyháza Spartacus FC players
Győri ETO FC players
Hajdúböszörményi TE footballers